George I of Hesse-Darmstadt (10 September 1547 – 7 February 1596) was the Landgrave of Hesse-Darmstadt from 1567 to 1596.

Early life 
Born on 10 September 1547 in Kassel, he was the fourth son of Philip I the Magnanimous of Hesse and his wife, Christine of Saxony.

Biography 
Following his father's death in 1567 Hesse was divided between his four sons.  George I received the upper County of Katzenelnbogen and selected Darmstadt as his residence.  He died on 7 February 1596 and the Landgraviate was passed to his son Louis.

Marriages and issue 
On 17 August 1572, he married Countess Magdalene of Lippe (1552–1587). They had 10 children.

 Philip William (1576–1576), Hereditary prince
 Louis V (1577–1626), Landgrave of Hesse-Darmstadt
 married in 1598 Princess Magdalene of Brandenburg (1582–1616)
 Christine (1578–1596)
 married in 1595 Count Frederick Magnus of Erbach-Fürstenau (1575-1618)
 Elisabeth (1579–1655)
 married in 1601 Count John Casimir of Nassau-Weilburg-Gleiberg (1577–1602)
 Marie Hedwig (1580–1582)
 Philip III (1581–1643), Landgrave of Hesse-Butzbach
 married firstly, in 1610, Countess Anna Margarethe of Diepholz (1580–1629)
 married secondly, in 1632, Countess Christine Sophie of East Frisia (1600–1658)
 Anna (1583–1631)
 married in 1601 Count Albert Otto of Solms-Laubach (1576–1610)
 Frederick I (1585–1638), Landgrave of Hesse-Homburg
 married in 1622 Countess Margarethe of Leiningen-Westerburg (1604–1667)
 Magdalene (1586–1586)
 John (1587–1587)

On 25 May 1589, he married Duchess Eleonore of Württemberg (1552–1618). They had 1 child:

 Henry (1590–1601).

Ancestors

References
Wikisource: Allgemeine Deutsche Biographie, "Georg I v. Hessen-Darmstadt"

|-

1547 births
1596 deaths
Nobility from Kassel
Landgraves of Hesse-Darmstadt